Llano Quemado is an unincorporated community and former census-designated place in Taos County, New Mexico, United States, situated immediately southwest of Ranchos De Taos.

See also

References

External links

Unincorporated communities in Taos County, New Mexico
Unincorporated communities in New Mexico
Former census-designated places in New Mexico